The 2014 Baia Mare Champions Trophy was the first Baia Mare Champions Trophy. It was held in Baia Mare, Romania from 15 to 17 August as a pre-season international women's team handball tournament for clubs. Two-time EHF Champions League winner Krim and FTC-Rail Cargo Hungaria appeared in the tournament, along with the hosts HCM Baia Mare and others.  

The tournament was aired on Digi Sport 2 and Digi Sport 3.

HCM Baia Mare won the title by defeating FTC-Rail Cargo Hungaria in the final.

Participants
  HCM Baia Mare (hosts)
  Krim
  FTC-Rail Cargo Hungaria
  HC Astrakhanochka
  Rostov-Don
  IUVENTA Michalovce

Results

Group stage

Group A

Group B

Knockout stages

5th place game

3rd place game

Final

Awards

Team of the Tournament
Goalkeeper: 
Left wing: 
Left back: 
Playmaker: 
Pivot: 
Right back: 
Right wing:

Special awards
Top Scorer: 
Best Goalkeeper:  
Best Defence Player: 
Most Valuable Player: 
Fair Play Award:

References

External links 

    

Baia Mare Champions Trophy
2014 in handball
2014 in Romanian sport
Sport in Baia Mare
Baia Mare Champions Trophy